Diving Equipment and Marketing Association (DEMA, formerly the Diving Equipment Manufacturers Association), is an international organization dedicated to the promotion and growth of the recreational scuba diving and snorkeling industry. With more than 1,300 members, this non-profit, global organization promotes scuba diving through consumer awareness programs and media campaigns such as the national Be a Diver campaign; diver retention initiatives such as DiveCaching; and an annual trade-only event for businesses in the scuba diving, action watersports and adventure/dive-travel industries, DEMA Show.

Board Members serve three-year terms.

Purposes and objectives 

The purposes and objectives of the Association are published as:
 To promote the advancement of the diving industry, to promote and encourage the growth of diving activities, and to enhance the growth and public enjoyment of the sport of diving.
 To establish continuing business education programs to aid industry members, their officers and employees.
 To facilitate the exchange of information among industry members, through experts, internet-based programming, manuals and conferences, and other media on such subjects as quality control, general industry statistics, governmental regulations, product standards and/or certification, standardized methods of keeping books and records, and related topics of industry interest.
 To support the diving industry with communication services, media relations and resources.
 To support the diving industry in monitoring and communicating on legislation that impacts diving and to represent the industry before the executive, legislative and judicial branches of government throughout the United States and in foreign jurisdictions.
 To support the diving industry in the monitoring and protection of the environment through education and activities.

See also

References

External links 

 

Diving organizations
Marketing organizations
International trade associations
Organizations established in 1963
Professional associations based in the United States
1963 establishments in the United States